Chatteris Cricket Ground is a cricket ground in Chatteris, Cambridgeshire.  The first recorded match on the ground was in 1832, when Cambridge Town Club played the Marylebone Cricket Club in the ground's only first-class match.  The ground was first used for Minor Counties Championship cricket when Cambridgeshire played Lincolnshire in 1967.  From 1967 to 1971, the ground hosted 4 Minor Counties Championship matches, the last of which saw Cambridgeshire play Bedfordshire  Chatteris CC was formed in 1879 and it is uncertain if the field used in 1832 is the same one currently used by the town club in Wenny Road.

References

External links
Chatteris Cricket Ground on CricketArchive
Chatteris Cricket Ground on Cricinfo

Cricket grounds in Cambridgeshire
Sports venues completed in 1832
Chatteris